Nininho is a nickname. It may refer to:

 Nininho (footballer, 1923-1997), Antônio Francisco, Brazilian football striker
 Nininho (footballer, born 1992), Salatiel Bartolomeu De Paiva Filho, Brazilian football right-back